The  is a women's professional wrestling championship owned by the Ice Ribbon promotion. The championship was introduced on November 28, 2009, when Riho defeated Nanae Takahashi and Tsukasa Fujimoto to become the inaugural champion. Championship matches are contested in a three-way match format and have a 15-minute time limit, and the title is vacated in the event of a time limit draw. Though primarily contested for by female wrestlers, two male wrestlers, Ribbon Takanashi and Choun Shiryu, have also held the title.

Like most professional wrestling championships, the title is won as a result of a scripted match. There have been forty-four reigns shared among twenty-nine wrestlers. The title is currently vacant after Yuki Mashiro relinquished it over her retirement from professional wrestling.

History 
Riho was the first champion in the title's history. Neko Nitta holds the record for most reigns, with six. Nitta also holds the records for both the shortest, at 11 days, and the longest, at 389 days, reigns in the title's history. Overall, there have been  forty-four reigns shared among twenty-nine wrestlers. The championship is currently vacant.

Reigns

Combined reigns 

References

External links 
 Title history at IceRibbon.com
  Triangle Ribbon Championship

Ice Ribbon championships
Women's professional wrestling championships